Silas Barber (June 30, 1824 – April 4, 1893) was a member of the Wisconsin State Assembly.

Biography
Barber was born in Berkshire, Vermont on June 30, 1824. There have been different reports as to the year of his birth. On April 27, 1848, Barber married Amelia Hasbrouck. They had three children. In 1851, he settled in Waukesha, Wisconsin. Barber died on April 4, 1893.

Career
Barber was a member of the Assembly during the 1868 and 1875 sessions. Other positions he held include Town Treasurer. He was a Democrat.

References

External links

People from Berkshire, Vermont
People from Waukesha, Wisconsin
City and town treasurers in the United States
1893 deaths
Year of birth uncertain
1824 births
Democratic Party members of the Wisconsin State Assembly